Port Burwell Wind Farm (formerly known as the Erie Shores Wind Farm) is a large wind farm near Port Burwell, Ontario, Canada.

In 2004, Port Burwell was awarded a generation contract by the Government of Ontario as part of its renewable energy plan. This wind farm was officially opened on April 13, 2006.

The project comprises 66 GE 1.5 MW Wind Turbines (model 1.5 SLE).

An important measure of renewable energy generation is the capacity factor (actual output per year divided by the nameplate output). Published reports show that the developers were expecting the capacity factor to be higher – 28.6% to 32%.

See also

List of wind farms in Canada

References

External links

 AIM PowerGen Corporation, the developer.
 Stapletonprice Inc., David J. Price the Project Director and Original Asset Managers.
 Capstone Infrastructure, the second owner.
 Wind power in Ontario
 A .PDF of construction, Phase I.
 Article on the official opening from the London Free Press.
 Fact sheet 
 Municipality of Bayham's information page

Energy infrastructure completed in 2006
Buildings and structures in Elgin County
Wind farms in Ontario